Ndogo is a Ubangian language, one of the nine major languages of South Sudan, and is taught in primary school. It is used as a secondary language by the Gollo and some of the Gbaya, among others.

A 2013 survey reported that ethnic Ndogo reside in Besselia and Mboro Bomas, Beselia Payam, Wau County, South Sudan.

References

Languages of South Sudan
Sere languages